Psi Hydrae (ψ Hydrae) is a star system in the equatorial constellation of Hydra. Based upon an annual parallax shift of 14.09 mas as seen from Earth, it is located around 231 light years away from the Sun. It is faintly visible to the naked eye with an apparent magnitude of 4.97.

System
This is a probable astrometric binary system. The primary, component A, is an evolved giant star with a stellar classification of K0 III. It is a red clump star that is generating energy through the fusion of helium at its core. It is radiating 56 times the solar luminosity from its photosphere at an effective temperature of 4,680. K.

Cultural significance
The Kalapalo people of Mato Grosso state in Brazil called this star and β Hya Kafanifani.

References

K-type giants
Horizontal-branch stars
Astrometric binaries
Hydra (constellation)
Hydrae, Psi
BD-22 3515
Hydrae, 45
114149
064166
4958